The Lahaina Civic Center is a sports, convention and entertainment complex located at Ka'a'ahi Street and Honoapi'ilani Highway in Lahaina, Hawaii, on the island of Maui.  It is the site of the annual Maui Invitational Basketball Tournament, held every November during Thanksgiving week and hosted by Chaminade University.  Other events include the World Youth Basketball Tournament in July, concerts, trade shows, community festivals and fairs.

History
The Lahaina Civic Center was built in 1972.

Air conditioning was first installed in the building in 2005, reportedly after North Carolina men's basketball coach Roy Williams complained about condensation on the floors during the Maui Invitational Tournament.

Facilities

Gymnasium 
The Civic Center Gymnasium is a 2,400-seat indoor arena with 20,800 square feet (160' by 130') of arena floor space, permanent seating on the East end and retractable bleachers on the North and South ends. It has four limited locker room facilities and two public restrooms. The arena floor can accommodate side-by-side recreation courts with the North and South bleachers retracted.  

The Social Hall is an air-conditioned 4,140-square-foot (90' by 46') meeting room with seating for up to 322 people.  It can be divided into two smaller rooms and contains a basic kitchen.

The breezeway hosts a war memorial. 

Three payphones (two at the main concourse and one at the gym) are available along with water fountains.  Maui County Parks and Recreation is located in this building.

Amphitheater
The 2,000-seat amphitheater is an open-air auditorium with a 2,176-square-foot (68'-by-32') stage, tiered lawn seating, dressing rooms and sound and lighting systems.  The lawn measures .

Other facilities
Five tennis courts are available, with overhead lighting and water fountains.  Parking is available for 900 cars.

References

External links
 

Basketball venues in Hawaii
College basketball venues in the United States
Convention centers in Hawaii
Maui Invitational
Tennis venues in Hawaii
Amphitheaters in the United States
Buildings and structures in Maui County, Hawaii
Indoor arenas in Hawaii
Tourist attractions in Maui County, Hawaii
Lahaina, Hawaii
Sports venues completed in 1972
1972 establishments in Hawaii